Altınpınar, historically and still informally called Kızboğan, is a village in the Araban District, Gaziantep Province, Turkey. The village is inhabited by Alevi Turkmens of the Chepni tribe.

References

Villages in Araban District